The  is one of five active Armies of the Japan Ground Self-Defense Force.  It is headquartered in Itami, Hyōgo. Its responsibility is the defense of Chūgoku, Kansai, Shikoku and the Southern half of the Chūbu region.

Organization 

  Central Army, in Itami
  3rd Division, in Itami, responsible for the defense of the Hyōgo, Kyōto, Nara, Ōsaka, Shiga and Wakayama  prefectures.
  10th Division, in Nagoya, responsible for the defense of the Aichi, Fukui, Gifu, Ishikawa, Mie and Toyama prefectures.
  13th Brigade, in Kaita, responsible for the defense of the Chūgoku region.
  14th Brigade, in Zentsūji, responsible for the defense of Shikoku.
 4th Engineer Brigade, in Uji
 6th Engineer Group (Construction), in Toyokawa
 7th Engineer Group (Construction), in Uji
 102nd Equipment Company, in Uji
 304th Engineer Company, in Izumo
 305th Engineer Company, in Okayama
 307th Vehicle Company, in Uji
 Western Army Artillery Unit, in Matsuyama, with three batteries of FH-70 155mm towed howitzers (in peacetime under administrative control of the 14th Brigade)
 8th Anti-Aircraft Artillery Group, in Ono (Type 3 Chū-SAM)
 Central Army Combined (Training) Brigade, in Ōtsu
 47th Infantry Regiment, in Kaita
 49th Infantry Regiment, in Toyokawa
 4th Basic Training Battalion, in Ōtsu
 109th Training Battalion, in Ōtsu
 110th Training Battalion, in Matsuyama
 Central Army Aviation Group, in Yao
 5th Anti-tank Helicopter Battalion, in Ise
 Central Army Helicopter Battalion, in Mashiki
 Central Army Meteorological Company, in Mashiki
 Logistic Support Battalion, in Mashiki
 Central Army Logistic Support, in Kyoto
 Central Army Signal Group, in Itami
 104th Signal Battalion, in Itami
 104th Command Center Signal Battalion, in Itami
 303rd Central Communication Company, in Itami
 Central Army Medical Service, in Itami
 Central Army Military Intelligence Battalion, in Itami
 Kansai Logistic Depot, in Uji

External links 
 Central Army Homepage (Japanese)

Armies of the Japan Ground Self-Defense Force
Military units and formations established in 1960